Benjamin Ofeimu (born September 30, 2000) is an American soccer player who plays as a defender for Miami FC in the USL Championship.

Playing career

Youth
Ofeimu appeared as an amateur player for United Soccer League side Bethlehem Steel FC during their 2018 season via the Philadelphia Union academy.

Ofeimu has committed to playing college soccer at Penn State University from 2019 onward.

Club

Philadelphia Union II
In January 2019, Ofeimu officially signed his first professional contract with Bethlehem Steel FC, later named Philadelphia Union II, having impressed during his academy loan spells during the 2018 season.

Birmingham Legion
On May 1, 2021, Ofeimu signed with USL Championship side Birmingham Legion. Following the 2021 season, Birmingham declined their contract option on Ofeimu.

Miami FC
Ofeimu joined Miami FC on January 25, 2021.

References

External links 
 

2000 births
Living people
American soccer players
Association football defenders
Birmingham Legion FC players
Miami FC players
Philadelphia Union II players
People from West Bloomfield, Michigan
Soccer players from Michigan
Sportspeople from Oakland County, Michigan
USL Championship players